Tom Omey (born 24 April 1975 in Kortrijk) is a retired Belgian athlete who specialised in the 800 metres. He represented his country at three outdoor and two indoor World Championships.

Competition record

Personal bests
Outdoor
600 metres – 1:16.73 (Liège 2003)
800 metres – 1:45.75 (Rehlingen 2003)
1000 metres – 2:22.13 (Sondershausen 2002)
Indoor
800 metres – 1:47.67 (Lisbon 2001 – former national record)
1000 metres – 2:19.77 (Piraeus 2002)
1500 metres – 3:49.05 (Ghent 2006)

References

1975 births
Living people
Belgian male middle-distance runners
Sportspeople from Kortrijk
Flemish sportspeople